Thamniochaete is a genus of green algae in the family Aphanochaetaceae.

References

Chaetophorales genera
Chaetophorales